Jettingen-Scheppach is a market community in the Günzburg Landkreis in the Schwaben (Swabia) Regierungsbezirk in Bavaria. It lies between Ulm and Augsburg. Its population as of 1 December 2005 was 7,044.

Politics 

Jettingen-Scheppach's first mayor is Christoph Böhm, elected in March 2020.

Community council 

All together, the community council (Gemeinderat) has 21 seats, which as of the last communal election on 16 March 2014 are distributed thus:
CSU: 8 seats
Free Independent Voter Community (FUW): 6 seats
Young Citizens: 6 seats

Economy and infrastructure

Transport 
Jettingen-Scheppach is conveniently located at the Burgau junction on Autobahn A 8 (Stuttgart-Munich section). The borough of Jettingen has a railway station on the line between Ulm and Augsburg. There are hourly regional trains to Ulm (travel time 38 minutes) and Augsburg (28 to 37 minutes), as well as trains every other hour to Munich (78 minutes).

Twinnings 
The borough of Freihalden in Jettingen-Scheppach has been twinned with the French pilgrimage town of Ars-sur-Formans since 1976. Jettingen-Scheppach has also been twinned with the Hungarian community of Csolnok since 1992.

Personalities

People born in the town 
Johann Ernst Eberlin (1702–1762), composer and organist
Claus Schenk Graf von Stauffenberg (1907–1944), Wehrmacht soldier in the Second World War and member of the 20 July Plot
Dominikus Böhm (1880–1955), architect

References

External links 
 Jettingen-Scheppach's official website

Populated places in Günzburg (district)